is a Japanese professional wrestler who currently works for DDT Pro-Wrestling, where he is a member of the The37Kamiina stable.

Professional wrestling career

DDT Pro-Wrestling (2021–present)
After having fought two exhibition matches in June and December 2020, Kojima made his official debut in DDT Pro-Wrestling, on December 27, in the opening match of the D-Oh Grand Prix 2021 final event, losing to Hideki Okatani.

Kojima's first victory came at Into The Fight 2021, on February 28, 2021, when he and Yusuke Okada defeated the team of Keigo Nakamura and Yuki Ueno. On June 6, at CyberFight Festival 2021, during his match teaming with Yuki Iino against Junta Miyawaki and Kinya Okada, he dislocated his left elbow. He made his return on November 3, at the D-Oh Grand Prix 2021 II event at the Ota City General Gymnasium. At the event, he teamed with Yuya Koroku and defeated Hideki Okatani and Yuki Ishida. On November 6, Kojima joined the The37Kamiina stable.

On June 25, 2022, during the Dramatic Dream Tour in Yokohama, he teamed with his stablemates Mao, Yuki Ueno and Shunma Katsumata, and also Shinya Aoki to defeat the DDT Legend Army (Poison Sawada Julie, Takashi Sasaki, Gentaro, Mikami and Thanomsak Toba) and win his first title, the KO-D 10-Man Tag Team Championship.

Professional wrestling persona
Kojima's entrance theme in DDT is "All I Want" by The Offspring.

Championships and accomplishments
DDT Pro-Wrestling
KO-D 10-Man Tag Team Championship (1 time, current) – with Mao, Yuki Ueno, Shunma Katsumata and Shinya Aoki

References

External links

Toui Kojima's profile on DDT's website

1999 births
Living people
Japanese male professional wrestlers
Sportspeople from Saitama Prefecture
21st-century professional wrestlers
KO-D 8-Man/10-Man Tag Team Champions